Stas Baretsky (born 8 March 1972 in Lomonosov, Leningrad, Russian SFSR, Soviet Union) is a Russian musician. He has worked with the groups Leningrad and EU.

Biography 

Baretsky worked as a gravedigger and security guard in the 1990s, later unsuccessfully running a cafe and market. He wrote poetry as a young man. In 2002 he made songs based on this work. In the period from 2003 to 2004 he recorded two solo albums, Цензура ("Censorship") and Цензура-2 ("Censorship-2"). Neither of these albums brought Baretsky stardom.

In 2004 he worked with the group named EU. They released an album in 2005, Электронщина (Elektronschina) featuring a stencil of his face on the cover. He performed at concerts with EU in Moscow and St Petersburg. He then worked with the group Leningrad, writing lyrics for a song.

Baretsky is best known for his aggressive and anti-west stances. He frequently picks fights on television shows and radio interviews, sometimes being invited specifically to cause trouble. Baretsky is vocally antiimport and anti anything he deems capitalistic. He often draws a crowd to witness him make these statements. In 2015, Baretsky drove his BMW into a field and lit it on fire to promote Russian industry. He announces that all imported goods are evil and they should be destroyed. He then burns his BMW and drives away in a Russian made Lada Kalina. Baretsky is also known for biting into beer cans and twisting them apart, spraying those around him.

Creation 
He began to write poetry at the age of 14, and only in 2002 decided to write songs based on them. “In general, I never intended to write songs. And then we talked somehow with a sound engineer friend, Kolya. I have been writing poetry since I was fourteen, but I have never shown it to anyone. He says: “Let's try to record.” - “And who will sing?” - “Yes, you will sing.” I went to the microphone, gave out something ... Over the evening, we recorded two songs. And Kolya had garter on Radio Chanson. And bam, I’m somehow listening to the Chanson radio, and there is my song. I was just shocked."In the period from 2003 to 2004 he recorded two solo albums published on the trap label: “Censorship” and “Censorship-2”. Some of the songs were on the radio "Petrograd - Russian Chanson."

In 2004, his work became interested in the electronic duo "Christmas tree toys", located in the same city. They invited him to record an album and give concerts in clubs. The album "Electronschina" has become one of the most striking musical events of 2005. At the beginning of 2006, Baretsky had several successful performances in Ukraine with other musicians from the collection “Forbidden Variety” except for “Christmas Tree Toys”, including with 2H Company; in Kiev, the entrance to the concert had to be closed when 600 people gathered. On March 7, 2006, Stas performed at the Moscow club “Ikra” after the presentation of the album YOI “Warm Math” (“Warm Mathematics”) and a performance by 2H Company; some listeners left the room.

In addition to concerts with Christmas tree decorations in Moscow and St. Petersburg, Stas joined the concert of the Leningrad group, wrote lyrics for the songs Sky Heaven and Credit for the album Bread. According to Baretsky, he no longer speaks with Leningrad, because he doesn’t call Cords, but he doesn’t want to ask. While with the “Christmas tree toys”, he believes that “they did not agree on the characters in terms of music”, as the band’s musicians prefer to engage in creative experiments, and Baretsky suggested “stupidly make turbochanson and ride in clubs”.

Brother 3 
In 2019, he announced his desire to make the film "Brother 3".

Discography  

 Цензура - Censorship - 2003
 Цензура-2 - Censorship-2 - 2004
 Электронщина - Elektronschina - 2005 (with EU (group))
 Тут по ящику нам дали (together with Andrei Erofeev) (not officially published)
 Романтик Блядь Коллекшн - Romantic Fucking Collection - 2011
 Дискотека - Discoteca - 2013
 Девяностые - Nineties - 2014
 Умереть за попсу! - 2015
 Нулевые - 2015
 Малиновый пиджак - 2015
 Турбодискотека - 2015

Filmography 

 2-Асса-2 2009
 Жесть Миллионов - Zhest Million - 2010
 Шапито-шоу - Tent Show - 2011
 Литейный - Casting - 2011
 Give me your money- Little Big- 2015
 Brother 3 -  2020

References 

This article is based on the Russian Wikipedia article, :ru:Барецкий, Станислав

Russian chanson
Russian hip hop
1972 births
Living people
Russian musicians
People from Lomonosov